Ocnogyna nogelli is a moth of the family Erebidae. It was described by Julius Lederer in 1865. It is found in Asia Minor.

References

Spilosomina
Moths described in 1865